Fury at Smugglers' Bay is a 1961 British adventure film produced, written and directed by John Gilling and starring Peter Cushing, Bernard Lee, Michèle Mercier and John Fraser. The plot revolves around smuggling in Cornwall. Studio sequences were filmed at Twickenham Film Studios in west London with the external sequences representing the coast of Cornwall actually being shot at Abereiddy on the north Pembrokeshire coast in south-west Wales.
Although filmed in colour, scenes of shipwrecks during a storm have been lifted from an earlier black-and-white film and have been tinted to match the other footage.

Plot

In 18th century Cornwall, Squire Trevenyan (Peter Cushing), a magistrate to a sleepy fishing village, is blackmailed by a vicious smuggler, Black John, (Bernard Lee) into keeping quiet about his murderous gang’s shipwrecking racket. The squire’s son (John Fraser) deepens the dilemma when he attempts to stand up for his honour, his father’s and that of the girl he loves (Michèle Mercier) whose own father (George Coulouris), a petty thief, has been sentenced to a penal colony at the insistence of Black John. The daughter engages the help of a local highwayman (William Franklyn), an honourable thief who watches over those he has robbed to ensure their safe return home, to stop Black John once and for all.

Cast
 Peter Cushing as Squire Trevenyan 
 Bernard Lee as Black John 
 Michèle Mercier as Louise Lejeune 
 John Fraser as Christopher Trevenyan 
 William Franklyn as The Captain 
 George Coulouris as François Lejeune 
 Liz Fraser as Betty 
 June Thorburn as Jenny Trevenyan 
 Katherine Kath as Maman 
 Maitland Moss as Tom, the butler 
 Tommy Duggan as Red Friars 
 Juma (actor) as Juma
 Christopher Carlos as The Tiger, a pirate
 Miles Malleson as Duke of Avon 
 Alan Browning as 2nd Highwayman
 Bob Simmons as Carlos

Critical reception
In the Radio Times, David Parkinson gave the film three out of five stars, and noted, "as Cushing suggested in his memoirs, this 1790s adventure is tantamount to an English western, with a saloon brawl, sword-wielding showdowns and a last-minute rescue. However, the peripheral characters are more subtly shaded, with Miles Malleson's comic nobleman and George Coulouris's abused outsider being particularly well realised."

References

External links

1961 films
1960s historical adventure films
British historical adventure films
Films directed by John Gilling
Films set in the 1780s
Films set in Cornwall
Films set on beaches
1960s English-language films
1960s British films